Prakashanna Awade aka Prakash Kallappanna Awade is a leader of Independent and a member of the Maharashtra Legislative Assembly elected from Ichalkaranji Assembly constituency in Kolhapur city.

Positions held
 2004: Elected to Maharashtra Legislative Assembly.
 2019: Elected to Maharashtra Legislative Assembly.

References

1953 births
Living people
Members of the Maharashtra Legislative Assembly
People from Kolhapur